Aquaria is the fourth studio album by Polish singer Doda. It was released by Queen Records and Polydor Records under exclusive license from Universal Music Polska on 21 October 2022.

Aquaria is a combination of pop, dance-pop and electronic. 

It peaked at number three on the Polish albums chart and has been certified platinum by the Polish Society of the Phonographic Industry (ZPAV). It spawned five singles "Don't Wanna Hide", "Fake Love", "Melodia ta", "Wodospady" and "Zatańczę z aniołami".

Track listing
Credits adapted from the liner notes.

Charts

Weekly charts

Year-end charts

Certifications

Release history

References

2022 albums
Polish-language albums
Doda (singer) albums
Universal Music Group albums